Anson Northup (possibly Anson Northrup) was a  sternwheel riverboat named for her captain who was the first to navigate the Red River of the North from Fort Abercrombie, Dakota Territory, to Fort Garry, Rupert's Land, departing 6 June and arriving 10 June 1859. Sold and renamed Pioneer, she sank during the winter of 1861–2.

The new Anson Northrup is a riverboat that normally offers tours in the Twin Cities area on the Mississippi River.  The boat was built in Louisiana and is operated by Padelford Packet Boat Company. In 2004, the boat participated in the Grand Excursion, which ran from the Quad Cities of Iowa to the Twin Cities.

References

External links
 
 
 https://www.gov.mb.ca/chc/archives/_docs/hbca/ships_histories/anson-northup.pdf
 https://library.ndsu.edu/fargo-history/?q=content/steamboats-1859-1871
 https://www.gov.mb.ca/chc/hrb/plaques/plaq0019.html

Riverboats
Hudson's Bay Company ships